Gilbert "Gil" Hatton (born July 31, 1956 in Alburtis, Pennsylvania), also known as Gibby Hatton, is a former American track cyclist and current cycling trainer. 

In 1976 and 1977, Hatton was American vice-champion in the sprint. He finished as third in the Keirin at the UCI Track World Championships 1983 in Zurich and was the first American to be invited to the International Keirin Series in Japan, racing there from 1984 until 1991.

After the end of his career in 1992, Hatton continued racing in the masters class. Hatton has also worked as cycling coach. He has supervised Marty Nothstein, a multiple world champion, American cyclists Jessica Grieco, Rebecca Quinn, and Amber Holt, and the South African driver Jean-Pierre van Zyl. In 2003, Hatton was added into the Hall of Fame of the Valley Preferred Cycling Center in Trexlertown, Pennsylvania.

References 

Living people
1956 births
American male cyclists
American cycling coaches
Sportspeople from Lehigh County, Pennsylvania